PSR B1829−10 (often shortened to PSR 1829−10) is a pulsar that is approximately 30,000 light-years away in the constellation of Scutum. This pulsar has been the target of interest, because of a mistaken identification of a planet around it. Andrew G. Lyne of the University of Manchester and Bailes claimed in July 1991 to have found "a planet orbiting the neutron star PSR 1829-10" but in 1992 retracted. They had failed to correctly take into account the ellipticity of Earth's orbit, and had incorrectly concluded that a planet with an orbital period of half a year existed around the pulsar.

See also
 Exoplanet
 Hypothetical planet
 Pulsar planet

Sources

Further reading
 
 
 
 
 

Pulsars
Scutum (constellation)